Licinopsis is a genus of ground beetles in the family Carabidae. There are about six described species in Licinopsis, found in the Canary Islands.

Species
These six species belong to the genus Licinopsis:
 Licinopsis alternans (Dejean, 1828)
 Licinopsis angustula Machado, 1987
 Licinopsis gaudini Jeannel, 1937
 Licinopsis obliterata (Wollaston, 1865)
 Licinopsis picescens (Wollaston, 1864)
 Licinopsis schurmanni Machado, 1987

References

Platyninae